Martin Čakajík (born December 12, 1979) is a Slovak ice hockey player. He plays for GKS Katowice in the Polska Hokej Liga.

He previously played for HC Dukla Trenčín in his home country, and HC Bílí Tygři Liberec, HC Oceláři Třinec, Plzeň HC, and HC Znojemští Orli in the Czech Republic.

References

External links

1979 births
Living people
Beibarys Atyrau players
GKS Katowice (ice hockey) players
HC Benátky nad Jizerou players
HC Bílí Tygři Liberec players
HC Oceláři Třinec players
HC Plzeň players
HK Dukla Trenčín players
Orli Znojmo players
Slovak ice hockey defencemen
Yertis Pavlodar players
Slovak expatriate ice hockey players in the Czech Republic
Slovak expatriate sportspeople in Kazakhstan
Slovak expatriate sportspeople in Poland
Expatriate ice hockey players in Kazakhstan
Expatriate ice hockey players in Poland
Sportspeople from Trenčín